Magnus Donald Blackburn Bradbury (born 23 August 1995) is a Scotland international rugby union player who plays for Bristol Bears in the Gallagher Premiership.

Rugby Union career

Amateur career

Bradbury started playing rugby with Oban Lorne. From Oban High School, Bradbury secured a scholarship to study at Merchiston Castle School.

In April 2015 he won the BT Scottish Cup with Boroughmuir in their 55–17 win against the Border club Hawick scoring two tries.

Professional career

As Oban is affiliated to Glasgow, Bradbury first represented Glasgow District at under-16 and under-17 levels - but with his move to Merchiston he came under Edinburgh's catchment area. Bradbury then represented Edinburgh District at under-18

Magnus made his professional début for Edinburgh in their Guinness PRO12 clash away to Leinster on Hallowe'en 2014.

On Monday 28 August 2017 Bradbury was announced as Edinburgh Rugby captain for the 2017/18 Pro14 season.

In March 2022 Bradbury announced he would leave Edinburgh Rugby and join Bristol Bears at the start of the 2022/23 Premiership Rugby season.

International career

Bradbury has represented Scotland U17 and Scotland U18. He made his U18 international debut, coming off the bench, against England in March 2013 - and he then made the starting XV in the U18 victories over Ireland and Wales.

His Scotland U20 debut came against the Irish in Athlone, in January 2014 and he scored his first try against Argentina in the final play-off game in the 2014 IRB JWC in Auckland.

He made his 7s début in 2015 at the Dubai 7s reaching the Plate final.

On Saturday 19 November 2016 Bradbury earned his first cap at full Scotland international level. Starting at 6 in an Autumn Test against Argentina he played a part in Scotland's remarkable 19-16 winning performance at Murrayfield Stadium.

He was called up to the 2019 Rugby World Cup squad on 8 September 2019 as injury cover as Jamie Ritchie fractured his cheekbone.

References

External links 

1995 births
Living people
Boroughmuir RFC players
Edinburgh Rugby players
Male rugby sevens players
Oban Lorne RFC players
People educated at Merchiston Castle School
People educated at Oban High School
Rugby union flankers
Rugby union number eights
Rugby union players from Glasgow
Scotland international rugby sevens players
Scotland international rugby union players
Scottish rugby union players